Rennert can refer to:

People
 Ari Rennert, American businessman
 Dutch Rennert (1930-2018), American baseball umpire
 Günther Rennert (1911–1978), German opera director and administrator
 Ira Rennert (born 1934), American investor and businessman
 Peter Rennert (born 1958), American tennis player
 Wolfgang Rennert (1922–2012), German opera conductor

Places
 Rennert, North Carolina

Surnames from given names